The aerial hoop (also known as the lyra, aerial ring or cerceau/cerceaux) is a circular steel apparatus (resembling a hula hoop) suspended from the ceiling, on which circus artists may perform aerial acrobatics.  It can be used static, spinning, or swinging. Tricks that can be performed include the Candlestick, Bird's Nest and Crescent Moon

Connections 
Tabs are the connection points where the aerial hoop attaches to the rigging.  Most aerial hoops connect at either one point (single tab configuration) or two points (double tab configuration). The number of tabs an aerial hoop has will depend on how it will be used, the intended effect, and the performer's comfort level. 

 Double tab hoops hung from two points (at equal or wider spacing as the tabs on the hoop) will swing like a trapeze (or a child's swing) and do not spin. 
 Double tab hoops connected to a single aerial point, the hoop can spin and swing in a multi axis plane i.e. a pendulum swing or a circular flight pattern. 
 All double tab hoops have the ability to hinge from the tab points when the artist hangs from the top portion of the hoop making this style the very different in acrobatic capacity than a single tab hoop.  
 Single tabs hung from a single point can spin, and swing along more than one axis i.e. a pendulum swing or a circular flight pattern.

Types 
Aerial hoops can be hollow or solid. Lighter hoops will spin more easily; once a solid hoop gets momentum, it will stay spinning for much longer. Sometimes aerial hoops have crossbars or hand or foot loops to aid the performer.

Footnotes

References 
 Circus By Us Different Lyra Types
  simplycircus.com
 Simply Circus: Lyra Resource Page
 Simply Circus: Aerial Arts FAQ
 Basic Circus Arts Instruction Manual: Chapter 8 - "Manual for Safety and Rigging." [PDF, 3.3 MB] European Federation of Professional Circus Schools (FEDEC), 2008.
 FM 5-125: Rigging Techniques, Procedures, and Applications. [PDF, 3.6 MB] US Army, 1995.
 Steven Santos. Simply Circus:  "Rigging I." [Powerpoint presentation, 572 KB]
 Sharon McCutcheon, Geoff Perrem.  Circus in Schools Handbook. Tarook Publishing, 2004.
 Hovey Burgess, Judy Finelli. Circus Techniques.  Brian Dube, 1989.
 Carrie Heller.  Aerial Circus Training and Safety Manual. National Writers Press, 2004. 
 Shana Kennedy. Aerial Skills Illustrated 2007. Project 630570 at Lulu.com, 2007.
 Jayne C. Bernasconi and Nancy E. Smith. Aerial Dance. United States: Human Kinetics, 2008.  View at Google Books
 Elena Zanzu, M.A. Il Trapezio Oscillante: Storie di Circo nell'Aria. (The Swinging Trapeze: Histories of the Circus in the Air.) Bologna University, Italy, 2004-2005. Language: Italian.
 Rebekah Leach and Julianna Hane. The Aerial Hoop Manual Volume 1. AerialDancing.com

External links
 Aerial Arts FAQ (From Simply Circus)
 Lyra Tutorials Page (From Simply Circus)
 Coggs' Circus Q/A (Lyra): 
 U.S. Aerial Lyra Champion 2015 Rebekah Burke (From )
 This article articulates how someone built an aerial hoop-- the key tool is a hydraulic pipe bender.

Circus equipment